The Dayton-Wright RB-1 (Rinehart Baumann model one), also known simply as the Dayton-Wright Racer was a high wing single-engine monoplane racing aircraft developed in the United States to participate in the 1920 Gordon Bennett Cup air race.

Design and development
The RB-1 was a high-wing monoplane with a monocoque fuselage and cantilever wing built around a solid balsa wood core laminated with plywood and covered in linen that incorporated a mechanism designed by Charles Hampson Grant to vary its camber in flight by adjusting the angles of the leading and trailing edges, with the trailing edge being a plain flap, and the leading edge functioning similarly. The aircraft also featured a retractable undercarriage operated by a hand-crank making it one of the first instances of undercarriage retraction for aerodynamic benefit alone.
The propeller shaft was mounted through a large oval radiator. The pilot had no forward view, but was provided with flexible celluloid side windows. Cockpit access was through a hatch in the top of the fuselage.
A prototype was built using non-retractable gear and strut-braced wings. A shorter tapered "racing wing" was installed afterward with leading and trailing edge flaps interconnected with landing gear deployment. The mechanisms and hinges for the wing flaps were exposed across the top of the solid wing. The racing wing produced directional instability requiring small tail fins to be added.

Operational history

Dismantled and shipped to France, the RB-1 was flown by Howard Rinehart in the 28 September 1920 race, but was forced to withdraw after a cable failure prevented retraction of the gear/flap mechanism, allowing the two Nieuport-Delage NiD.29V racers to make a one-two finish.
After the race it was returned to the United States, and is now preserved at the Henry Ford Museum in Dearborn, Michigan. Many of the aircraft's advanced features were incorporated into a prototype fighter, the XPS-1.

Variants
 Dayton-Wright XPS-1 - A 1921 Pursuit aircraft using the RB landing gear design.

Specifications

See also

References

Notes

Citations

Bibliography

External links
 aerofiles.com

1920s United States sport aircraft
Racer
High-wing aircraft
Single-engined tractor aircraft
Aircraft first flown in 1920